Tabu Osusa (born 21 July 1954) is a Kenyan author and music producer, and the founder of Ketebul Music.

Career

In 1974 Osusa decided to travel the DRC then Zaire, settling in Barumbu Kinshasa where he was first introduced to music by the Kenyan saxophonist Ben Nicholas. Osusa returned to Kenya in 1977 and briefly joined the band Les Kinois. Since then, Osusa has been a composer, recording artist, songwriter, promoter, band manager and producer.

In 2007, Tabu Osusa founded Ketebul Music. He is the acting director of the organisation, assisted by some people with varied knowledge and skills in the wider field of arts and culture. The chairman of Ketebul Music is the kenyan cartoonist Maddo.

In 2014, Tabu Osusa with Ketebul Music was appointed by the Smithsonian Folkways to select artists and co-produce the albume African Rhythms: Songs from Kenya

Tabu Osusa was the lead author of Shades of Benga: The Story of Popular Music In Kenya 1946-2016.  The book published in August 2017 traces the origins of Kenya's popular music to the end of the Second World War to date.

In 2016 he was nominated Five Music Rights Champion by the International Music Council

References

1954 births
Kenyan record producers
People from Nyanza Province
Kenyan company founders
Living people